Island of Adventure may refer to:
 Islands of Adventure, a Florida theme park.
 The Island of Adventure, a children's book by Enid Blyton.